ACLC may refer to:

Alameda Community Learning Center, Alameda, California
AMA Computer Learning Center (now ACLC College), part of AMA Education System, Philippines
American Clergy Leadership Conference
Army Cadet League of Canada
Association of Confessional Lutheran Churches, based in the U.S.